In the writings of the Ancient Greek chronicler Herodotus, the phrase earth and water ( ge kai hydor) is used to represent the demand by the Persian Empire of formal tribute from the cities or people who surrendered to them.

Usage in Herodotus' histories

In Book 4, Herodotus mentions for the first time the term earth and water in the answer of king Idanthyrsus of the Scythians to king Darius. In Book 5, it is reported that Darius sent heralds demanding earth and water from king Amyntas I of Macedon, which he accepted. It was also requested of the Athenian embassy to Artaphernes in 507 BC, which complied. In the 6th book, Darius sent heralds throughout Greece demanding earth and water for the king (Hdt. 6.48). There were not many city-states that refused.

In Book 7, he recounts that when the Persians sent envoys to the Spartans and to the Athenians demanding the traditional symbol of surrender, an offering of soil and water, the Spartans threw them into a well and the Athenians threw them into a gorge, suggesting that upon their arrival at the bottom, they could "Dig it out for yourselves."

Interpretation 
The demand for earth and water symbolized that those surrendering to Persians gave up all their rights over their land and every product of the land. Giving earth and water, they recognized the Persian authority over everything; even their lives belonged to the king of Persians. Then negotiations would take place to specify the obligations and the benefits of the liegemen.

The phrase earth and water, even in modern Greek, symbolizes unconditional subordination to a conqueror.

According to the modern historian J. M. Balcer, the significance of earth and water is that they were Zoroastrian symbols and representative of vassalage to the Persian Empire. "Persian heralds traveled throughout Greece demanding the recognition of Persian Suzerainty and the Zoroastrian symbols of earth and water, the marks of vassalage...".

Result of not surrendering Earth and Water 
In order to appease Xerxes, who was about to launch the Second Persian invasion of Greece after succeeding his father, Darius, two Spartans were voluntarily sent to Susa for execution, in atonement for the death of the Persian heralds sent earlier by Darius. This did not satisfy Xerxes who punished the Greeks by defeating the Spartan Army and destroying Athens.

See also 
 Persian Wars

References

Further reading

External links 
 Livius.org: Earth and water

Greco-Persian Wars
Greek words and phrases
Achaemenid Empire